Lois Harriet Gresh is a New York Times Best-Selling author of ten science fiction novels and story collections and seventeen popular science and pop culture books, some in collaboration with Robert Weinberg. Gresh has also written approximately sixty short stories. Her work spans genres such as mysteries, thriller, suspense, dark fantasy, horror, and science fiction. She is probably best known  for  weird science fiction stories, which blend computer technology with biology, botany, and post-cyberpunk. She was a staff book reviewer for Science Fiction Weekly from November 2004 through December 2008.

Her books have been translated into twenty-two languages and are in print worldwide: Italy, Japan, Spain, Russia, Germany, Portugal, France, Brazil, Thailand, Korea, China, Estonia, England, Canada/French, Finland, Poland, Czech, etc. They have been reviewed in the New York Times Book Review, USA Today, Entertainment Weekly, Science News, National Geographic, Physics Today, New Scientist, and U.S. News & World Report, as well as by National Public Radio, the BBC, Fox News, the History Channel, and other television and radio programs. Gresh is a frequent guest on science and pop culture television programs.  Gresh' teen novels have been endorsed  by the American Library Association  and the Voice of Youth Advocates .

Works
The Termination Node, Random House/Del Rey, science fiction novel, adult, 1999 hc/pb, co-author Robert Weinberg
The Computers of Star Trek, Basic Books, science, adult, 2000 hc/trade, co-author Robert Weinberg
DragonBall Z, St. Martin's Press, young adult, 2000 trade
TechnoLife 2020, science+novella, ECW Press, adult, 2001 trade
Chuck Farris and the Tower of Darkness, science fiction novel, young adult, ECW Press, 2001 trade
Chuck Farris and the Labyrinth of Doom, science fiction novel, young adult, ECW Press, 2001 trade
Chuck Farris and the Cosmic Storm, science fiction novel, young adult, ECW Press, 2002 trade
The Science of Superheroes, John Wiley & Sons, science, adult, 2002 hc/trade, co-author Robert Weinberg
The Science of Supervillains, John Wiley & Sons, science, adult, 2004 hc/trade, co-author Robert Weinberg
The Science of James Bond, John Wiley & Sons, science, adult, 2006 trade, co-author Robert Weinberg
The Science of Anime, science, adult, 2005 trade, co-author Robert Weinberg
Exploring Lemony Snicket, St. Martin's Press, science, young adult, 2004 hc
The Unauthorized Eragon Guide, St. Martin's Press, science, young adult, 2006 trade
The Unauthorized Guide to His Dark Materials, St. Martin's Press, science, young adult/adult, 2007 trade
The Science of Stephen King, John Wiley & Sons, science, adult, 2007 hc,  co-author Robert Weinberg
The Fan's Unauthorized Guide to the Spiderwick Chronicles, St. Martin’s Press, science, young adult, 2007 trade
The Unauthorized Guide to Artemis Fowl, St. Martin’s Press, science, young adult, 2008 trade
The Many Mysteries of Indiana Jones, John Wiley & Sons, science, adult, 2008 trade, co-author Robert Weinberg
The Twilight Companion - The Unauthorized Guide to the Series, St. Martin's Press, young adult, 2008 trade
The Hunger Games Companion, St. Martin's Press, 2011 trade  
Eldritch Evolutions, Chaosium, 2011 trade   
Blood and Ice, Elder Signs Press, 2011, trade
The Mortal Instruments Companion, St. Martin's Press, 2013
Dark Fusions, PS Publishing, 2013
The Divergent Companion, St. Martin's Press, 2014
Sherlock Holmes vs. Cthulhu: The Adventure of the Deadly Dimensions, Titan Books, 2017
Sherlock Holmes vs. Cthulhu: The Adventure of the Neural Psychoses, Titan Books, 2018
Sherlock Holmes vs. Cthulhu: The Adventure of the Innsmouth Mutations, Titan Books, 2019

Sources 
Review of TechnoLife 2020 by A.L. Sirois on SF Site.com

External links
Lois Gresh' official homepage
Good reads author page

20th-century American novelists
21st-century American novelists
American horror writers
American science fiction writers
American science writers
American women short story writers
American short story writers
American women novelists
Cthulhu Mythos writers
Year of birth missing (living people)
Living people
Women science writers
Women science fiction and fantasy writers
Women horror writers
20th-century American women writers
21st-century American women writers
American women non-fiction writers
21st-century American non-fiction writers
21st-century American male writers